Separation Sunday is the second studio album by the American indie rock band The Hold Steady, released on May 3, 2005 through Frenchkiss Records. A concept album, Separation Sunday follows the interconnected stories of several fictional characters: Craig (the narrator), Holly (short for Halleluiah), a sometimes addict, sometimes prostitute, sometimes born again Christian/Catholic (and sometimes all three simultaneously); Charlemagne, a pimp; and Gideon, a skinhead, as they travel from city to city and party to party.

Separation Sunday is lyrically dense, full of Biblical allusions, self-reference word play, and puns.  Vocalist/songwriter Craig Finn typically delivers these lyrics in a distinct flavor of sprechgesang.

Musically, Separation Sunday touches on elements of Classic rock: guitar solos, riff-based structures, use of piano and organ, and guitar harmony.  Structurally, however, most songs eschew the standard verse-chorus-verse song structure, frequently foregoing choruses or refrains altogether. In a review of the album, Blender described The Hold Steady as "sound[ing] like the best bar band in the world."

The album cover was photographed at the corner of Maspeth Avenue and Conselyea Street in Williamsburg, Brooklyn.

The song "Your Little Hoodrat Friend" was featured on the video game Tony Hawk's Project 8.

Critical reception

The album received an 8.7 on Pitchfork, and ranked at number eight on the 2005 Pazz & Jop critic's poll. The album was named the number ten album of the year by Spin. Punknews.org ranked the album at number 18 on their list of the year's 20 best releases.

Track listing
All songs written by Craig Finn and Tad Kubler, except where noted.
"Hornets! Hornets!" – 4:48
"Cattle and the Creeping Things" – 3:47
"Your Little Hoodrat Friend" – 3:54
"Banging Camp" – 4:16
"Charlemagne in Sweatpants" – 3:59
"Stevie Nix" (Finn, Kubler, Galen Polivka) – 5:28
"Multitude of Casualties" – 3:06
"Don't Let Me Explode" (Finn, Franz Nicolay) – 2:23
"Chicago Seemed Tired Last Night" (Finn, Kubler, Nicolay) – 3:20
"Crucifixion Cruise" – 1:51
"How a Resurrection Really Feels" – 5:32

2016 CD reissue bonus tracks
"212-Margarita" – 3:58 
"The Most Important Thing" – 3:57 
"Cattle and the Creeping Things" (demo) – 3:50 
"Charlemagne in Sweatpants" (demo) – 3:58 
"Crucifixion Cruise" (guitar demo) – 1:38
"Crucifixion Cruise" (piano demo) – 1:46

Personnel

The Hold Steady
Craig Finn – lead vocals, guitar
Tad Kubler – guitar
Galen Polivka – bass guitar
Franz Nicolay – keyboards
Judd Counsell – drums (1-4, 11)
Bobby Drake – drums (5-10)

Additional musicians
Nicole Wills – vocals
Peter Hess – horns
Tim Byrnes – horns
Alan Ferber – horns

Technical
Dean Baltulonis – producer, engineer, mixing
Dave Gardner – producer, engineer, mixing, mastering
Tad Kubler – design, layout
Seth Jabour – design, layout

References

2005 albums
The Hold Steady albums
Frenchkiss Records albums